is a former professional baseball infielder and manager in Japan's Japanese Baseball League (JBL) and Nippon Professional Baseball (NPB). As a player his team won nine JBL championships; as a manager his teams won five Japan Series championships.

Mizuhara was a star third baseman for Keio University.

Mizuhara played his entire professional career for the Tokyo Giants/Tokyo Kyojin/Yomiuri Giants, from the Japanese Baseball League's beginnings in 1936 until 1950. Playing second base for Tokyo in 1942, Mizuhara was voted Most Valuable Player of the JBL. Mizuhara served in the Japanese military during World War II, eventually being captured by the Russians; while in the prisoner of war camp, he introduced baseball to his captors.

The JBL reorganized to Nippon Professional Baseball in 1950, and Mizhuara became player-manager of the Giants (although he retired as a player after the season). As manager for the Giants from 1950 to 1960, the Toei Flyers from 1961 to 1967, and the Chunichi Dragons from 1969 to 1971, Mizuhara compiled a record of 1586–1123, for a .585 winning percentage. As manager, he guided his teams to five Japan Series championships, four of those with Yomiuri and one with Toei.

Mizuhara was elected to the Japanese Baseball Hall of Fame in 1977.

References

External links

1909 births
1982 deaths
Baseball people from Kagawa Prefecture
Keio University alumni
Japanese Baseball Hall of Fame inductees
Japanese baseball players
Yomiuri Giants players
Nippon Professional Baseball MVP Award winners
Managers of baseball teams in Japan
Baseball player-managers
Yomiuri Giants managers
Hokkaido Nippon-Ham Fighters managers
Chunichi Dragons managers
Japanese military personnel of World War II
Japanese prisoners of war
World War II prisoners of war held by the Soviet Union